Helmut Winklhofer (born 27 August 1961) is a German former professional footballer who played as a defender or midfielder for Bayer 04 Leverkusen and FC Bayern Munich. He won four German titles and played in the 1987 European Cup Final before his career was cut short by injury in 1990.

He is also known for scoring one of the best own goals in football history from a difficulty standpoint, larroping the ball from approximately 30 yards out past his own keeper in the 1985–86 Bundesliga against KFC Uerdingen 05 in a 1-0 loss for Bayern.

Honours

Club
Bayern Munich
 Bundesliga: 1985–86, 1986–87, 1988–89, 1989–90
 DFB-Pokal: 1981–82, 1985–86
 European Cup: Runner-up 1986–87
 DFL-Supercup: 1987

International
Germany
 FIFA World Youth Championship: 1981

References

External links
 

1961 births
Living people
People from Passau (district)
Sportspeople from Lower Bavaria
Footballers from Bavaria
German footballers
Germany youth international footballers
Germany under-21 international footballers
Association football defenders
Bundesliga players
FC Bayern Munich footballers
FC Bayern Munich II players
Bayer 04 Leverkusen players
West German footballers